Escape the Night is an American reality television series created, hosted, produced, and owned by Joey Graceffa that was first broadcast on June 22, 2016, on YouTube Premium. The series follows fantasy plots based on horror and murder mystery aesthetics. The fourth season was released on July 11, 2019. The series was produced by Brian Graden Media.  It was the longest-running series on YouTube Premium until 2020, when Graceffa announced that he would be selling the series to a different network for a fifth season.

Premise
The series follows The Savant (Joey Graceffa) as he finds himself in an estate in a past era, where he invites a number of guests to a party and requires them to act and dress as various personas from that era. Once there, they are isolated from the outside world, and tasked with surviving the night and escaping the estate. To achieve this, the guests team up with him to participate in challenges and escape room puzzles, competing with each other to escape from the historical era by solving and completing the challenges. At the end of each episode, two guests are voted into a challenge to compete against each other, where the losing guest is eliminated via a fictional death until one or more guests ultimately win and are sent back to the modern world.

Production

Conception 
When YouTube Premium launched in October 2015, Graceffa's show was one of ten exclusive original series scheduled to debut in 2016, and was still an untitled project. The series was set to be produced by Brian Graden Media, and began filming in a house near Valencia, California. Graceffa said that the show was inspired by an episode of television show Lizzie McGuire themed around a murder mystery, and was also closely related to the 1985 film Clue. Graden called the show "a hybrid between scripted mystery and reality elimination show".

Distribution 
The series debuted on June 22, 2016, with two episodes going live. The premiere episode had 11.3 million views and 1.1 billion social impressions. The show was renewed for a second season in October 2016, and was scheduled to debut on June 22, 2017. In May 2018, Graceffa confirmed there would be a third season, which debuted on June 21, 2018. The fourth season, which made it the longest running original series on YouTube, premiered on July 11, 2019. The first episode of season 4 premiered simultaneously at VidCon during a panel conference with Graceffa, and was also available to watch for free on YouTube.

Escape the Night: Escape Room 
The Escape the Night: Escape Room was an immersive escape room centered around the fourth season of Escape the Night. The escape room was a limited event exclusively in Beverly Hills, California, that ran from August 9, 2019, to August 27, 2019. The escape room had multiple rooms to venture through, with surprise guest appearances from Graceffa, Jack O'Connor (Mortimer), and Eva Augustina Sinotte (The Sorceress).

Board game 
In June 2020, Graceffa announced via vlog that due to COVID-19's impact on Hollywood and television, Season 5 was postponed indefinitely, but teased a new interactive fan version. Fans of the show signed up to an email list in order to receive updates about the new project. In July 2020, a Kickstarter campaign was started to fund a board game based on the series; its goal of $30,000 was achieved in just 3 hours. It was formally announced the next day.

End on YouTube Premium, possible fifth season, and potential spinoff 
In June 2020, it was confirmed that YouTube Premium had declined to renew the show for a fifth season, possibly canceling its longest running original series. In June 2021, Graceffa stated in a vlog that YouTube will no longer fund and distribute further seasons of the series, but has stated that he has full ownership of the intellectual property, and is currently pitching the series for another season under a different network, and is also developing a potential spinoff.

Cast and characters 
 Joey Graceffa as The Savant

Season 1 (1920s)

Guests

Recurring 
 Paul Chirico as Arthur
 Katia Hayes as Sarah
 David Hutchison as Marvin

Season 2 (The Victorian Era)

YouTubers

Recurring 

 Lindsay Elston as Alison
 AJ Martin as Jetpack Girl
 Eva Augustina Sinotte as The Sorceress
 Jermain Hollman as Morgan

Season 3  (1978)

YouTubers

Recurring 
 Shontae Saldana as Calliope
 Jack O'Connor as Mortimer
 Micah Fitzgerald as The Carnival Master
Amy Johnston as Jael, a member of the SAE
Chris Wu as Ryu, a member of the SAE

Season 4: All Stars

YouTubers

Recurring
 Nikita Dragun
 Matthew Patrick
 Jack O'Connor as Mortimer
 Eva Augustina Sinotte as The Sorceress
 Shiobann Amisial as The Collector
 Amy Johnston as Jael
 Chris Wu as Ryu
 Liza Koshy

Episodes

Season 1 (2016)

Season 2 (2017)

Season 3 (2018)

Season 4: All Stars (2019)

Elimination charts

Color key:

 The guest was one of the final survivors, winning the season.
 The guest was sent into, or found themselves in the death challenge and survived.
 The guest died, either by being sent in the death challenge, or finding themselves in the elimination and eligible for death without a vote.
 The guest was killed in a planned death
 The guest had to forfeit their life without or outside a death challenge taking place.

 The guest was killed in a plot twist.
 The guest was revived.
 The guest survived the episode without being sent into a death challenge or finding themselves in danger of being eliminated.
 The guest died in a previous episode and does not appear.

Season 1 

 Note: There was an extra guest at the start of the season in the form of "The Renegade", played by Shane Dawson. Within the storyline, Shane knew about the evil of the house as a member of the "Society Against Evil" and informed Sarah the maid that he knew what she was doing. As a result, the evil saw Shane as a threat and poisoned him. In order to save him, the other guests had to complete a puzzle task within a time limit. They failed, resulting in his death. Interviews with production staff confirmed that even if the group had completed the task within the time limit, Shane would instead have been killed by Marvin the groundskeeper when the car exploded later in the episode.

Season 2

Season 3

Season 4 - All Stars

Awards and nominations

See also 

 Whodunnit? (2013 U.S. TV series)
 Murder in Small Town X
 Scared Famous (TV series)
 The Quest (2014 TV series)
 Busted!

Notes

References

External links 
 

2010s American mystery television series
2010s American reality television series
2016 American television series debuts
2019 American television series endings
2016 web series debuts
2019 web series endings
American fantasy television series
English-language television shows
Television series set in 1978
Television series set in the 1920s
Television series set in the 1940s
Victorian era in popular culture
YouTube Premium original series